"Only You Freestyle" is a song by written and performed by British rapper Headie One and Canadian rapper Drake, released on 20 July 2020 by Relentless Records and OVO Sound. It served as the lead single to the former's debut studio album, Edna (2020).

Background
The song was announced and teased the day before release via social media by the two artists. Commenting on the collaboration, Drake stated: "I had to go hard, especially on a track with one of the best drill artists in the world. Scratch that—the best drill artist in the world."

"Only You Freestyle" is a UK drill track produced by M1onthebeat, who "gives the pair an eerie backdrop laden with drilly 808s and lurching bass for them to deliver their barrage of crud talk and bravado." It is the third drill-styled track released by Drake in 2020, following "War" and "Demons" from his commercial mixtape, Dark Lane Demo Tapes (2020).

Critical reception
Complex complimented the production by M1onthebeat, writing that the producer "uses just a few key elements to huge effect—an ethereal vocal harmony here, some clicking 808s there and a shuddering bass line throughout—all of it coming together for a mood that's grand and cinematic in its scope. Like all good drill instrumentals though, the crucial part is that it holds back just enough to let the bars take the limelight."

Music video
A music video directed by Nathan James Tettey and Theo Skudra was released alongside the song on 20 July 2020 via Headie One's YouTube channel. Drake performs his verse in a parking lot accompanied by OVO affiliates, with Headie One performing in a dimly-lit building. Artwork was created by British artist MLDNCM.

Charts

Certifications

Release history

References

2020 songs
2020 singles
Drake (musician) songs
Headie One songs
Songs written by Drake (musician)
Songs written by Headie One